P. N. Pattabhirama Sastri was an Indian philologist and scholar of Sanskrit literature and Vedas, known for his works on Sanskrit Philology and Mīmāṃsā or the hermenutics of the Vedas. He was the founder vice chancellor of the Rashtriya Sanskrit Vidyapeetha, a deemed university dedicated to Sanskrit studies. He was also the founder of a non governmental organization in Uttar Pradesh for the promotion of arts, culture and education, which is now known as Shri Pattabhirama Shastri Veda Mimansa Anusandhan Kendra. Vaidikaśikṣādarśanabindhuḥ, Āpastambaśrautasūtra Dhūrtasvāmibhāsya, Mīmāṃsāśāstramālā, Tautātitamatatilaka and Śāstradīpikā, prabhāsahitā are some of his notable works. The Government of India awarded him the third highest civilian honour of the Padma Bhushan, in 1982, for his contributions to literature and education. Rashtriya Sanskrit Vidyapeetha honored its founder vice chancellor by naming its central library as Mahamahopadhyaya  Sri Pattabhirama Sastri Library. The 8th volume of Kendriya-Saṃskṛtavidyāpīṭham anuvādagranthamālā has been republished as Mahamahopadhyaya Padmabhushana Sri P.N. Pattabhirama Sastri commemoration volume in his honor.

Selected bibliography

See also 

 Sanskrit literature
 Vedas
 Mīmāṃsā
 hermenutics
 Rashtriya Sanskrit Vidyapeetha

References

External links

Further reading 
 

Recipients of the Padma Bhushan in literature & education
Year of birth missing
Year of death missing
Sanskrit grammarians
Indian Sanskrit scholars
Heads of universities and colleges in India
Indian philologists
20th-century Indian linguists